Asparagus pea is a common name for several plants and may refer to:

Tetragonolobus purpureus aka Winged Pea
Psophocarpus tetragonolobus aka Winged Bean
Asparagus bean